This is a list of Danish television related events from 1981.

Events
28 February - Tommy Seebach and Debbie Cameron are selected to represent Denmark at the 1981 Eurovision Song Contest with their song "Krøller eller ej". They are selected to be the fourteenth Danish Eurovision entry during Dansk Melodi Grand Prix held at the Valencia-Varieteen in Copenhagen.

Debuts

Television shows

Ending this year

Births
16 March Anne Kejser, TV & radio host & actress
20 May - Marie Egede, comedian and TV host

Deaths

See also
1981 in Denmark